The Arnhem–Nijmegen metropolitan area (originally called Knooppunt Arnhem-Nijmegen ) is a former Dutch plusregio, public body and intermunicipal institution, founded in 1988, for the co-operation in the areas of housing, transport and economics in the conurbation consisting of the Dutch cities of Nijmegen and Arnhem as well as the bordering municipalities of Berg en Dal, Beuningen, Doesburg, Duiven, Heumen, Lingewaard, Montferland, Mook en Middelaar, Overbetuwe, Renkum, Rheden, Rijnwaarden, Rozendaal, Westervoort, Wijchen, and Zevenaar. All except Mook en Middelaar (Limburg) are in the province of Gelderland. Its aim is regional cooperation. 
In 2022, a total of 774,506 people were living in the municipalities (1,000 km2).

The Dutch Plusregio was abolished by law in 2014, and the Arnhem–Nijmegen metropolitan area has been liquidated 1 July 2015.

External links 
 https://web.archive.org/web/20160220232950/http://www.destadsregio.nl/

Metropolitan areas of the Netherlands
Regions of the Netherlands
Regions of Gelderland
Arnhem
Nijmegen